Shostakovich (Szostakowicz) is a Polish-language surname. The surname may refer to:
 Dmitri Shostakovich (1906–1975), composer and pianist
 Galina Shostakovich (born 1936), pianist and biologist
 Maxim Shostakovich (born 1938), conductor and pianist

Polish-language surnames